The Women's team pursuit competition at the 2023 World Single Distances Speed Skating Championships was held on 3 March 2023.

Results
The race was started at 19:05.

References

Women's team pursuit
2023 in women's speed skating